Acklam Grange School is a co-educational secondary school located at Lodore Grove, Acklam, Middlesbrough, England.

The school opened in 1952 as Hugh Bell School – later becoming Stainsby School – and is currently Acklam Grange Secondary School (after Stainsby and Oaklands School amalgamated in 1983 the combined school was renamed Acklam Grange School). It educates pupils Year 7 through Year 11. The current headteacher is Michael Laidler.

The school is one of the few in the area that has continued to be a part of the Building Schools for the Future programme after the announced spending cuts by the Government.

The school received a Grade 3 (satisfactory) rating from Ofsted in 2012.

Previously a community school administered by Middlesbrough Council, in July 2018 Acklam Grange School converted to academy status. The school is now sponsored by The Legacy Learning Trust.

Structure 
Acklam Grange uses pastoral management schemes that manage the pupils by year group, with students being assigned a form tutor with whom they have significant daily contact and who is their contact point for any issues. This management structure was chosen instead of a house system.

Rewards for pupils are issued in a tiered system, including certificates, vouchers, and school trips. In Year 11, pupils have the opportunity to become prefects and senior prefects, where they assist in the management of the school and are overseen by a Head Boy and Head Girl.

Facilities 
Facilities include:
six 2-story buildings, each housing two or more departments
a dedicated VLE
Middlesbrough City Learning Centre, a community building offering IT facilities
Acorn Centre, a specialist sport centre

The new building, on the former playing fields of the old school, was constructed by contractors Willmott Dixon. It opened on 6 September 2010 and cost over £27 million. Pupil involvement in the building included landscaping, and the naming of areas through schemes such as the School Council and a specially-formed "Team 2010" group.

The Acorn Centre is a £2.2 million sport and inclusion facility which was opened in late January 2005 following its official launch by Gary Pallister (former Middlesbrough and England International footballer) and Councillor Hazel Pearson OBE (Chair of Governors). The development has been made possible due to receiving investment from Acklam Grange School, Middlesbrough Council, The West Middlesbrough Neighbourhood Trust (WMNT) and the Big Lottery Fund. It is a dual use facility for local school and community networks. It includes a sports hall, a fitness studio, and a classroom.

The site of the old school has since been landscaped into a car parking and entrance area. Bricks from the old school were sold to pupils, parents, staff, and alumni.

Notable former pupils
Pete Firman (Acklam Grange School), comedian and magician
Journey South (Acklam Grange School), singing duo

References

Educational institutions established in 1952
1952 establishments in England
Secondary schools in Middlesbrough
Academies in Middlesbrough